Luigi Antonini (September 11, 1883 – December 30, 1968) was an Italian-American trade union leader and anti-fascist organizer. He was the first Vice President  of the International Ladies Garment Workers Union, and organizer of the Italian-American Labor Council (IALC). He was one of the first to organize the Italian-American anti-fascist movement. Antonini joined the Anti-Fascist Alliance of North America in 1923. The group revolved around a newspaper published in New York, Il Nuovo Mondo.

See also
Labor history of the United States

References
Notes

Bibliography

Salvatore J. LaGumina, "Luigi Antonini." In The Italian American Experience: An Encyclopedia, ed. S.J. LaGumina, et al. (New York: Garland, 2000), 19–20.

External links

Luigi Antonini Papers at the Center for Migration Studies of New York.
Luigi Antonini Project
Guide to the ILGWU. Local 89. Luigi Antonini Correspondence, 1919-1968

1883 births
1968 deaths
People from the Province of Avellino
American trade union leaders
International Ladies Garment Workers Union leaders
Italian emigrants to the United States
American people of Italian descent